The sixth season of Dragon Ball Z anime series contains the Cell Games arc, which comprises Part 3 of the Cell Saga. The episodes are produced by Toei Animation, and are based on the final 26 volumes of the Dragon Ball manga series by Akira Toriyama. 

The 29-episode season originally ran from November 1992 to July 1993 in Japan on Fuji Television. The first English airing of the series was on Cartoon Network where Funimation Entertainment dub of the series ran from November 2000 to February 2001.

Funimation released the season in a box set on September 16, 2008, and in June 2009, announced that they would be re-releasing Dragon Ball Z in a new seven volume set called the "Dragon Boxes". Based on the original series masters with frame-by-frame restoration, the first set was released November 10, 2009.


Episode list

References

1992 Japanese television seasons
1993 Japanese television seasons
Z (season 6)